The Fröhlich Prize of the London Mathematical Society is awarded in even numbered years in memory of  Albrecht Fröhlich. The prize is awarded for original and extremely innovative work in any branch of mathematics. According to the regulations the prize is awarded "to a mathematician who has fewer than 25 years (full time equivalent) of involvement in mathematics at post-doctoral level, allowing for breaks in continuity, or who in the opinion of the Prizes Committee is at an equivalent stage in their career."

Prize winners
Source: LMS website 
2004 Ian Grojnowski
2006 Michael Weiss
2008 Nicholas Higham
2010 Jonathan Keating
2012 Trevor Wooley
2014 Martin Hairer
2016 Dominic Joyce
2018 
2020 Françoise Tisseur
2022 Richard Thomas

See also
 Whitehead Prize
 Senior Whitehead Prize
 Shephard Prize
 Berwick Prize
 Naylor Prize and Lectureship
 Pólya Prize (LMS)
 De Morgan Medal
 List of mathematics awards

References

External links
 LMS prizes

British science and technology awards
Awards of the London Mathematical Society
Early career awards
Biennial events